The mountain saw-wing (Psalidoprocne fuliginosa), also known as the mountain rough-winged swallow or the Cameroon Mountain rough-winged swallow is a species of bird in the family Hirundinidae.

It is found on Bioko island and adjacent Mt. Cameroon. While it has been reported elsewhere in Central Africa (namely, the Cameroon line of Cameroon and Nigeria), it has never been confirmed.

References

mountain saw-wing
Birds of the Gulf of Guinea
Birds of Central Africa
mountain saw-wing
Taxonomy articles created by Polbot